Mount Hanang is a mountain in northern Tanzania. The peak has an elevation of 3,420 m above sea level. Hanang is located in Manyara Region's Hanang District. It is (after Mount Kilimanjaro, Mount Meru and Mount Loolmalasin) the fourth-highest mountain in Tanzania, if you count the three peaks of Kilimanjaro as one mountain.

The principal path to the summit starts in the town of Katesh. The climb can be done in one day (10 hours), but it is also common for climbers to spend one night in a tented camp on the mountain and reach the summit on the second day.

Hanang Forest Reserve
Mount Hanang Nature Forest Reserve has an area of 58.66 km², protecting an enclave of evergreen montane forest on the mountain's higher slopes. Between 2000 and 2700 meters elevation, evergreen montane forest covers the mountain's wetter eastern and southern slopes, while the drier western and northern slopes are home to dry montane evergreen forest with bushland and grassland on the ridges. Above 2700 meters, the forests transition to ericaceous heathland and high-altitude grasslands.

See also
 List of Ultras of Africa
 Manyara Region

Gallery

References

External links
 http://wikimapia.org/1898603/Mount-Hanang
 http://www.geonames.org/maps/google_-4.433_35.4.html

Hanang
Hanang